George Michael: A Different Story is a 2004 documentary film about the English singer, songwriter and record producer George Michael. It follows Michael's life from joining Wham! in 1981, to the present-day covering his career as a solo artist including personal and professional gain and loss. The film is a British venture produced by Aegean Films with Gorilla Entertainment Limited serving as distributor.

Directed by Southan Morris, and produced by Caroline True. A Different Story was initially aired on British television channels BBC One and BBC Three. Despite this, the documentary had its European premiere as part of the 2005 Berlin Film Festival including a press conference on 16 February 2005. The film had a limited cinematic release in sixteen countries.

Synopsis

The idea of a documentary evolved because of his former bandmate Andrew Ridgeley being prepared to speak on camera and his father also agreeing to be interviewed.
A Different Story begins with Michael on a promotional tour in Milan, Italy for the album Patience released earlier in the year, showing brief clips of Michael in a radio interview with fans outside chanting his name.

Filmed over a year, the film chronicles the most up to date events of Michael’s life, beginning with his childhood in Hertfordshire, England, reflecting on his time as part of Wham!, and the first on-screen interview together with Ridgeley since the split. 

Michael discusses his success as a solo artist beginning in 1987 and the big impact of the successful album Faith which earned Michael a Grammy for Album of the Year in 1989 and the battles he had with the public and personal life including his sexuality.
During the promotion of the album Michael states that he had been striving to have the same level of success as Michael Jackson and Madonna. However, during the interview he admits that as  the Faith Tour ended and it started to fade, “I felt like I was going insane”.

It also touches briefly on the court case with Sony Music and the music business.

Other people interviewed for the film include his father Jack Panayiotou, David Austin, Mariah Carey, Geri Halliwell, Elton John, Sting, Noel Gallagher, Simon Cowell and Boy George.

Release
An edited 90 minute version of A Different Story was first broadcast on British television channel BBC One in the UK on 27 November 2004, by Gorilla Entertainment Limited. It was then aired on BBC Three with extra footage.
Following the broadcasts, the documentary was then screened at the 55th Berlin International Film Festival on the 16 February 2005 with a cinematic release in Germany on 12 January 2006. The North American screening took place at Manhattan’s Tribeca Film Festival between the 25 April and the 7 May 2005. The film was also part of the official selection at the Copenhagen and Rio de Janeiro Film Festivals. The film was released in Japan on 23 December 2005.

On 28 February 2006, the British Board of Film Classification announced that the film would receive  a 15 certificate rating. It was given a UK limited cinema release on 6 March 2006.

Marketing

During promotion for the film Michael attended a photo op and press conference hosted by Robert Fischer at the Berlin Film Festival with director Southan Morris, producer Caroline True and executive producer and manager Andy Stephens.
On 5 December 2005 Michael attended the UK screening for the film, held at London’s Curzon Mayfair Cinema. Michael also attended a press conference on 15 December 2005 held at the Tokyo Grand Hotel in Japan with a screening at the Bunkamura Le Cinéma.

Reception

Critical response
Eddie Cockrell of Variety wrote: "A candid, self-deprecating and altogether winning career-to-date overview, George Michael: A Different Story finds the witty and articulate pop star looking back with unblinking candor and wry humor."
Caroline Westbrook writing for Empire gave the film 3/5 stars, saying, "Michael himself comes across as a thoroughly decent bloke who's not afraid to talk candidly about coming to terms with his sexuality, the death of his mother and that headline-grabbing toilet incident." The Sydney Morning Herald wrote "The feature film lays out Michael's life with no punches spared." They added "For Michael, the documentary - being screened at the Berlin festival - is a chance to put the record straight". Mary Nyiri, writing for Kino Critics, said, "Even if you are not a fan of George Michael as a pop songwriter and lead singer, his story is entertaining and his bluntness refreshing", giving the film a 3/5 rating.

See also
List of British films of 2004

References

External links

George Michael
2004 films
2004 documentary films
British documentary films
2000s English-language films
2000s British films